Qorovul (Қоровул, قاراۋۇل, also Qoroul) is a village and seat of Urganch District in Xorazm Region in Uzbekistan.

References

Populated places in Xorazm Region